Pic de Sauvegarde is a mountain in the Pyrenees on the border between France and Spain. It has an altitude of 2737 m.

References

Mountains of the Pyrenees